Xanthobacter agilis is a dinitrogen-fixing, non-pleomorphic hydrogen-oxidizing and motile bacteria from the family of Xanthobacteraceae which has been isolated from a lake near Neuchâtel in Switzerland. Xanthobacter agilis produces o-phthalyl amidase.

References

Further reading

External links
Type strain of Xanthobacter agilis at BacDive -  the Bacterial Diversity Metadatabase

Hyphomicrobiales
Bacteria described in 1988